XHTPZ-TDT is a television station in Tampico, Tamaulipas, Mexico broadcasting on virtual channel 4. It is the Televisa local station for Tampico, with local news and programming alongside a selection of other Televisa programs.

History
XHTPZ was awarded as part of the 1994 62-station concession to Radiotelevisora de México Norte, a subsidiary of Televisa. It broadcast on analog channel 24.

On August 26, 2018, XHTPZ moved to virtual channel 4.

In 2018, the concessions of all non-network Televisa Regional stations were consolidated in the concessionaire Televisora de Occidente, S.A. de C.V., as part of a corporate reorganization of Televisa's concessionaires.

Digital television

Digital subchannels 
XHTPZ broadcasts on physical channel 16 (virtual channel 4.1). In February 2018, it started to broadcast FOROtv on its second subchannel; this moved to Las Estrellas transmitter XHGO-TDT in line with other cities in June 2018.

On January 1, 2020, XHTPZ activated a Nu9ve subchannel using major virtual channel 9. Prior to this date, Nu9ve was seen on XHFW-TDT alongside that station's local programming.

Prior to repacking on October 18, 2018, XHTPZ broadcast on physical channel 39.

References

Televisa Regional
Television stations in Tampico, Tamaulipas
1994 establishments in Mexico